The Grahame-White Type XIII was a racing seaplane built to compete in the Daily Mails 1914 Circuit of Britain air race, to be flown by company founder Claude Grahame-White. It was a conventional single-bay biplane with staggered wings of equal span braced by N-struts. The forward fuselage featured a highly streamlined aluminium engine cowling, with the rest of the construction being wood and fabric. The landing gear consisted of twin pontoons, with a small third pontoon carried beneath the tail.

The Circuit of Britain was cancelled due to the outbreak of World War I, and the sole Type XIII built was later converted into a landplane.

Specifications

References
 
 
 

1910s British sport aircraft
Floatplanes
Grahame-White aircraft
Single-engined tractor aircraft
Biplanes
Rotary-engined aircraft
Aircraft first flown in 1914